Swiss railway signalling describes the railway signalling systems used in Switzerland  by the different railway companies. There are two main types of signal, used up to 160 km/h, above which speed cab signalling is required.

Legal aspects 

Signalling is governed by strict rules, released by the Federal Office of Transport. The rules for railway operation are laid out in the Swiss Rail Service Regulations (Fahrdienstvorschriften (in German), Prescriptions de circulation des trains (PCT) (in French), Prescrizioni sulla circolazione dei treni (PCT) (in Italian)), of which the latest version was issued in 2012, valid since 1 July 2012 and are based on article 11a of the Ordinance of 23 November 1983 on the Construction and Operation of the Railways (Railways Ordinance, RailO).

Light signals 

Swiss light signals are divided into two classes, recognizable by the difference in shape of the signal: type L (for Light) and type N (for numérique (digital)). Type L was developed many years ago.  The  N system was developed for the Rail 2000 project and shows a clear influence of the Dutch NS'54 system. In contrast to the latter the type N uses the 3 coloured lights in a triangular position, whereas the Dutch system positions them in a vertical line. There are more differences, mainly signalling an occupied section of track to the driver.

In both systems, as is true elsewhere in the world, a distant signal tells the driver the aspect of the following home signal according to the block system.  The driver must act accordingly to prepare for the situation at the home signal. Distant signals are always square while home signals are round (N) or elongated (L). Signals are always placed on the left except on tracks normally operated in both directions or where visibility requires a different position.

According to the rules, light signals are used for main line traffic or shunting. N and L type signals are used for main line traffic and are not to be taken account of during shunting.  Shunting signals do not apply to main line movements.

The Swiss Federal Railways (SBB) are progressively replacing L type signals by N type signals, because  N type signals are more complete, better adapted to high speed operation (>140 km/h), allowing greater fluidity and thus increasing capacity.  Most other Swiss railway companies only use L type signals.

L type 

L type signals remain the most widespread in the country. It authorizes trains to proceed at their normal speed, to slow them down or to stop them.

The speed reductions imposed by type L signals, when they are protecting a station or a crossover, only apply to the points zone protected by the signal and not normally to the stretch of track beyond the points.  Thus if a signal presents the aspect 2 (maximum speed 40 km/h at the signal), the 40 km/h limit applies from the signal and over the points concerned. ; as soon as the train has passed the last points in deviated position it can accelerate to the operating speed.  This way of operating requires that the drivers understand for any signal which points are concerned.

A signal presenting the 'stop' aspect cannot be passed under any circumstances without a formal order from the train controller. This order can be transmitted in writing or by radio.  In the latter case the driver must repeat the order word for word. Once this order has been received, the driver can proceed at a speed slow enough that they may stop short of any obstruction de 40 km/h.
This restrictive procedure requires very slow operation.  There is a complementary signal, shown below, which gives the order 'Proceed on sight' without needing a written order, so as to avoid huge delays in case a signal breaks down.

In some cases, mostly entering stations, home signals and distant signals can be found on the same mast; in this case the distant signal is linked to the next home signal.

On lines where the blocks are relatively close a system called combined has been developed. The signal can then be presented on the same plate is a distant signal (warning or announcement of speed), an image of the home signal (track clear, stop or speed limit). To be recognized as a home signal, where the alignment of the lamps would not allow, the combined signal has a distinctive supplementary plate.

In combined L-type signals the distant signal ‘track clear’ is not shown but implied by the ‘proceed’ aspect. If two successive signals show speed limits, the first speed limit shown  must be applied from the second signal, even if not shown explicitly.

N Type 

N type signals are progressively replacing L type signals on the CFF/SBB network and are starting to be used by other companies, mostly the BLS.

In contrast to L type signals, not all N type home signals are preceded by a distant signal, as all N signals are capable of speed signalling and thus play the role of a distant signal.  Thus, if a driver passes an N type signal showing a speed aspect, he must maintain this speed until he has recognized the aspect of the next signal, which may continue to impose a speed restriction.

Speed signalling is no longer based on combinations of green and yellow, but on one colour accompanied by a single digit display indicating the speed. Thus the green aspect means 'track clear' and if a digit is displayed, with a speed restriction. The yellow aspect still means a warning or a speed restriction if a digit is displayed and a red aspect remains an absolute stop signal, only to be passed with a formal order or with safety equipment deployed.

In order to distinguish clearly between the two, distant signals use square plates while home signals use circular plates.

Shunting signals 

In Switzerland, shunting manoeuvres can be controlled either by shunting signals or dwarf signals. The maximum speed allowed for shunting is 30 km/h.  This can be increased in special cases to 40 km/h.  In any case speed must be compatible with visibility, local conditions and braking power.

Shunting signals are not integrated with automatic train protection systems such as  Integra-Signum or ZUB 121, so locomotives only used for shunting are not equipped with these systems.

Shunting signals are older technology and comprise fewer safety features. They control shunting paths and are not fitted with interlocks,. The driver must therefore ensure that points are set correctly through their intended path.

Shunting signals can protect one or more sets of points within a zone.

In sidings where there are no signals and the points are operated manually, orders are given by hand signals, acoustic signals or by radio.

Dwarf signals 

In contrast to shunting signals, dwarf signals protect paths and are interlocked. Points in zones equipped with dwarf signals do not have points indicators.

Dwarf signals have three aspects: 

Dwarf signals are usually positioned on the left of the tracks and only apply to that track. In case it is positioned on the right hand side of the track it has an illuminated indicator (arrow) to make clear for which track it is valid. They are set to allow the passage of trains as well as the standard light signals for mainline movements. The last dwarf signal before entering the main line will show a Proceed aspect for a train or a Proceed with caution aspect for a shunting movement.

Whatever kind of signal is used, the permission to move is given to the guard in charge who will then himself authorize the movement to start.  This is to avoid accidents to the team who may be working on a vehicle.

Remaining sections still need to be translated.  French source text in talk section

Complementary light signals 
There are many types of complementary light signals to be found on the Swiss Federal Railways network.  Only the most common ones will be shown here.

Complementary signals are  mostly used with type L signals, but some are used with type N. They can also be independent of either type. Mostly they are used
 to solve problems posed by grouped L signals
 to mitigate difficulties caused by the use of replacement equipment
 to communicate orders and information which cannot be communicated with standard signals

Complementary signals for grouped L type signals

A grouped signal is an L type signal which applies to several tracks, usually in stations.  The rules covering the presence of several trains waiting at a grouped signal dictate that the traffic controller must indicate to all trains that the signal will pass to 'go' and that they must not start.  The train which has not received this order is free to depart.
This system is rather slow, so complementary signals are used.

An illuminated numeric display is used to indicate which track is concerned by the signal, track 1 always being the one closest to the station building. Trains standing on other tracks know that this signal implies the 'halt' aspect for their tracks.
'Track free' indicators are also used which indicate which aspect applies to track where the indicator is installed.  In this example, the driver knows that the signal with aspect 2 permits him to start.

Auxiliary signals

Auxiliary signals are used to send permission to pass a signal which has failed or is showing the 'stop' aspect. This avoids the use of formal orders which would delay trains too much.  An auxiliary signal allows the driver to proceed at sight without needing communication between the driver and the traffic controller.

The auxiliary signal for N type signals is flashing red.

Other complementary signals

In some stations, signals are needed to communicate the right away to the driver.  He will then know that boarding is complete, the doors are closed and that he may depart.  This signal is actuated by the guard just before boarding himself. These signals are to be found along the platform and sometimes at the departure signal.

Other signals include, for example, an indication that a passenger has requested a stop at a request stop, the voltage in a variable voltage section or an order to test the brakes.

Signs 
Signs are used to protect or indicate a fixed feature such as a speed limit or a level crossing.

There are a number of signs that are all designed to protect or to indicate a fixed feature such as a speed restriction or a level crossing. The signs can be for mainline traffic, shunting traffic or both. They are usually located on the left of the track.

In Switzerland, the speed of a section is indicated on the route instructions a document that the driver uses to know the speed limits for each part of the route he uses.
However, the curves to be negotiated at low speed are indicated by signs and are only mentioned in the route instructions. The signs for these speed restrictions are called 'low speed section signs'. There is always, except immediately after a station, a sign indicating the speed restriction of the section in advance, followed by the speed restriction sign itself and then a final signal that ends the speed restriction. When several speeds are shown, the lower one still applies to trains of higher category and the upper one to the lower category.

In the example presented on the left, at the top is an advance warning for a speed restricted section, in the middle the sign to start the speed restriction and below the sign to end the speed restriction and return to normal speed.
There are also round speed restriction signs, with orange or green circumference, which apply only to tilting trains. These signals operate on the same principle.

Many other signs exist of which a small sample are shown here:

References 

Switzerland